Shakespeare in Action (SIA) is a 33-year educational and performing arts theatre company with a mandate to make the language and stories of Shakespeare accessible, fun and relevant to young people, their families, and the community. The company accomplishes this through workshops in schools and libraries across the GTA, summer camps, and main-stage productions.  To further this mandate, Shakespeare in Action recently established its first permanent home at Artscape Weston Common in Toronto’s Weston community and has dedicated itself to growing fun and accessible performing arts experiences in northwest Toronto.

History 

For thirty-two years, Shakespeare in Action (SIA) has aspired to enhance the arts and education through exploring and performing Shakespeare’s plays: fostering literacy, enhancing creativity and promoting speech arts by making the language and stories of Shakespeare accessible and relevant to audiences of all ages.  We have accomplished this by presenting Canadian interpretations and adaptations of Shakespeare’s plays for young audiences, and growing arts education outreach programs in schools, libraries and community centres.

In 2019, SIA became the resident professional theatre company at the new Artscape Weston Common in Toronto’s northwest.  As one of the few professional theatre organizations residing in this part of the city, we have begun to call Weston our permanent home and broaden our mandate to provide productions and learning opportunities that engage and reflect our community.

As an area that has been disproportionately affected by COVID-19, SIA has also pivoted our work during this pandemic to grow local partnerships and provide emergency support.  We began the Artists Supporting Community Initiative (ASCI)[1] which provides paid opportunities for out of work artists to assist emergency frontline agencies (food delivery for seniors, food prep, etc), as well as piloting free Pop Up Programming in the summer 2020 and 2021 for low-income youth where internet access is a barrier.

Inspired by some of the work and partnerships we engaged in over the pandemic, SIA changed our vision and mission toward growing a performing arts ecosystem anchored in community in 2021.

Current Vision and Mission 

Vision: To grow, support and sustain an accessible, collaborative and relevant performing arts ecosystem anchored in community.

Mission: Shakespeare in Action is a professional theatre and arts education company that nurtures and develops the next generation of performing artists, arts workers, educators, and audiences through the exploration and performance of classical and contemporary stories that are relevant to our community.  We accomplish this by:

 providing opportunities for artistic creators, arts-workers, educators, and community members to develop and strengthen their skills
 creating space for artists to showcase their work, and for community members to gather, learn, and participate
 growing accessible arts education to encourage experiential learning that makes a positive impact on the creativity and self-confidence of all who participate

Shakespeare in Action is a not-for-profit organization registered with the Canadian Revenue Agency: Charity Registration Number: 12721 1571 RR0001

Shakespeare in Action operates under the jurisdiction of the Canadian Actors Equity Association, and is proudly a member of many professional organizations including TAPA.

Previous Mandate 
Shakespeare in Action seeks to inspire audiences of all ages, and believes that Shakespeare can and should be accessible to everyone, regardless of age, race, education or sociology-economic background. The acting company is diverse and multi-racial.

The company focuses on demystifying Shakespeare’s language by the characters in today’s world and encouraging students to attach themselves to the stories within the play. The company’s main stage productions use Shakespeare’s original text, and their workshops and youth programs help students to work through the text, often through group performance, inspiring them to think about the historical background of the plays and the process behind production. The company's workshops and other programmed use Shakespeare's language as an opportunity for students to learn by doing.

Shakespeare in Action is a non-profit organization registered with the Canadian Revenue Agency. They operate under the jurisdiction of the Canadian Actors' Equity Association, hiring only professional actors, and have memberships with many professional organizations including the Professional Association of Canadian Theatres, the Toronto Alliance for the Performing Arts and Theatre Ontario.

Artistic Director 

Michael Kelly was the founder and previous artistic director of Shakespeare in Action. An actor, director, producer, teacher, and arts educator who has directed many contemporary and Shakespearean plays.

In April 2020, David di Giovanni was appointed Artistic Director. David started with SIA in 2017 as its Director of Education during which he worked closely with its founder to develop the strategic plan of the company, bring new audiences to its notice and to generate new revenues. He played an important role in the organization from 2017-2020, bringing skills in directing, grant-writing, relationship-building, and employee as well as financial management. Before being appointed, he served as its Interim Artistic Director and demonstrated a commitment to establishing himself and the organization as an integral part of the arts community in Weston.

In July 2022, SIA said goodbye to Artistic Director David di Giovanni after five years at the organization and two and a half years at the helm. SIA's Managing Producer Tamara Freeman stepped in as Interim Executive Director. Tamara has also been an integral part of SIA over the last two and a half years and SIA looks forward to her continued leadership through this transition.

Currently, SIA is in the process of hiring the company’s next Artistic Director, with an anticipated start date in October 2022.

References 

Theatre companies in Toronto
Shakespearean theatre companies